Puka Hirka (Quechua puka red, hirka mountain, "red mountain", hispanicized spelling Pucairca) is a mountain in the Cordillera Negra in the Andes of Peru, about  high. It is situated in the Ancash Region, Aija Province, on the border of the districts of Aija and La Merced, in the Huaraz Province, Huaraz District, and in the Recuay Province, Recuay District.

References

External links 

Mountains of Peru
Mountains of Ancash Region